This is a list of the 50 largest cities in the Americas by population residing within city limits as of 2015, the most recent year for which official population census results, estimates or short-term projections are available for most of these cities. These figures do not reflect the population of the urban agglomeration or metropolitan area which typically do not coincide with the administrative boundaries of the city. For a list of the latter, see List of metropolitan areas in the Americas by population. These figures refer to mid-2015 populations with the following exceptions:
Mexican cities, whose figures derive from the 2015 Intercensal Survey conducted by INEGI with a reference date of 15 March 2015;
Calgary, whose 2015 municipal census had a reference date of April 1.
Brazilian cities, whose figures originate from the 2021 estimate given by the IBGE, with a reference date of July 1, 2021.

Notes

References

 01
Americas
Geography of the Americas
Cities
Cities
Cities
Largest cities Americas